Acnemia nitidicollis is a Palearctic species of  'fungus gnat' in the family Mycetophilidae. The larvae of Acnemia are mycetophagous in rotting wood.

References

External links
 Images representing  Acnemia nitidicollis at BOLD

Mycetophilidae
Taxa named by Johann Wilhelm Meigen
Diptera of Europe
Diptera of Asia